Apparel Group LLC is a UAE based fashion and retail conglomerate company headquartered in Dubai, UAE.

The group has 2,025 retail outlets, 18,500 employees, and 80 brands. It is operational in 14 countries, predominantly in the GCC region. The group was founded by Sima Ved.

Apparel Group is functional in 120 countries, mostly  in the GCC region, such as UAE, Oman, Bahrain, Kuwait, Saudi Arabia, Malaysia, Thailand, Singapore, India, Pakistan, Egypt, South Africa, and Indonesia.

History
Apparel Group was founded by Sima Ved in 1996. Their first venture was the franchisee of Nine West in Dubai.

Brands functional under the group include Aéropostale (clothing), Nine West, Aldo Group, Charles & Keith, Tim Hortons, Dune London, Inglot Cosmetics, The Children's Place, Skechers, Cold Stone Creamery, Tommy Hilfiger (company), LC Waikiki.

Operations

Apparel Group operates in 14 countries, mostly in GCC region including UAE, Oman, Bahrain, Kuwait, Saudi Arabia, Malaysia, Thailand, Singapore, Indonesia, India, Pakistan, Egypt and South Africa. The group has over 98 brands.

Some of the destinations that Apparel Group brands are part of include:
Dubai Festival City Mall 
The Dubai Mall
Mall of the Emirates
Yas Mall 
Dubai Hills Mall 
Dalma Mall 
Assima Mall 
Mall of Oman

CSR and Philanthropy

To support the Expo 2020 Dubai Cares program, Apparel Group donated SKECHERS worth AED 1.5 million in school kits. In 2022, it partnered with Nefsy and Taharum Charity Foundation to help those affected by the COVID-19 pandemic and distributed 150 meals from Tim Hortons to less fortunate children. It also tied up with the Mohammed bin Rashid Al Maktoum Knowledge Foundation to donate 1,500 school bags to an orphanage. It engaged in several charitable activities during Ramadan in the UAE and Saudi Arabia, including clothes donation and an internal employee donation campaign. It was included in the Members of the Dubai Chamber Sustainability Network Taskforce that will start utilising Prompt Payment Practices for Suppliers and Subcontractors.

The group conducts initiatives for low plastic consumption and signed a pledge for the same.

The brands under its portfolio also take part in several CSR initiatives. TOMS introduced a shoe recycling program during its 15th anniversary at the Mall of the Emirates. F5 raised Dh30,000 for children's education with Emirates Red Crescent, while ALDO held a fundraising campaign to offer access to clean drinking water in the rural areas of Sub-Saharan Africa. 

In 2021, the Ministry of Health and Prevention (MoHAP) in Dubai tied hands with Apparel Group to provide parents with the skills to prepare healthy meals. Founder and Chairwoman Sima Ved purchased Salvador Dali's Etude de visages: Madonna, enfant et profile d'homme for $110,000 and contributed towards the 100 Million Meal Program. 
It was awarded the Dubai Chamber CSR Label and Dubai Chamber Advanced CSR between 2013-2020. In 2019, it won the Dubai Chamber MRM Business Award for its CSR activities. It also received the US Green Building Council's LEED (Leadership in Energy and Environmental Design) Platinum accreditation for its headquarters and warehouses.

The group was included among the Members of the Dubai Chamber Sustainability Network Taskforce that will start utilising Prompt Payment Practices for Suppliers and Subcontractors.

Awards

Featured in Great Place to Work rankings in 2022 and was previously ranked in 2021 and 2020.
Featured in RetailME Icons 100, the most powerful retail leader of the MENA, and won Images RetailME Awards.
Awards at the Filipino Times Awards 2019.
Mohammed Bin Rashid Al Maktoum Business Award.
The Dubai Quality Appreciation Award in 2014. 
Sheikh Khalifa Excellence Award Gold in 2014. 
Nine brands recognised as Consumer-Friendly Companies by Dubai Economic Development in 2020.

References

Retailing in the United Arab Emirates
Beauty organisations
Retail companies of the United Arab Emirates